Mark Knowles and Daniel Nestor were the defending champions, but lost in Quarterfinals to Wayne Black and Kevin Ullyett.

Black and Ullyett won the title, defeating Bob and Mike Bryan in the final 6–4, 6–2.

Seeds
All seeds received a bye into the second round.

Draw

Finals

Top half

Bottom half

External links
 Main Draw

Doubles